Hugh Jean "Danny" Adeline (born 7 October 1963) is a Seychellois windsurfer. He competed in the 1992 Summer Olympics.

References

External links
 
 
 

1963 births
Living people
Seychellois windsurfers
Seychellois male sailors (sport)
Olympic sailors of Seychelles
Sailors at the 1992 Summer Olympics – Lechner A-390